Trachischium guentheri, commonly known as the rosebelly worm-eating snake or Günther's worm-eating snake, is a species of colubrid snake, which is endemic to Asia.

Etymology
The epithet, guentheri, honors Albert Günther (1830–1914), German-born zoologist at the British Museum (Natural History).

Geographic range
T. guentheri is found in India (Sikkim, West Bengal), Bangladesh, Nepal, and Bhutan.

Description
The rosebelly worm-eating snake does have a rose-colored belly when alive. However, specimens preserved in alcohol are dark brown dorsally, with indistinct lighter and darker longitudinal streaks; and are yellowish ventrally, either uniform or scantily mottled with brown.

The dorsal scales are arranged in 13 rows and are smooth, except that the males have keeled dorsal scales in the anal/basicaudal region. The ventrals are 134–138; the anal plate is divided; and the subcaudals, which are also divided, number 34–39.

Adults may attain 28 cm (11 inches) in total length, with a tail 3.5 cm (1⅜ inches) long.

References

Further reading
Boulenger GA (1890). The Fauna of British India, Including Ceylon and Burma. Reptilia and Batrachia. London: Secretary of State for India in Council. (Taylor & Francis, printers). xviii + 541 pp. (Trachischium guentheri, new species, pp. 285–286).
Smith MA (1943). The Fauna of British India, Ceylon and Burma, Including the Whole of the Indo-Chinese Sub-region. Reptilia and Amphibia. Vol. III.—Serpentes. London: Secretary of State for India. (Taylor and Francis, printers). (Trachischium guentheri, p. 323).

Trachischium
Reptiles described in 1890
Taxa named by George Albert Boulenger
Reptiles of Bangladesh
Reptiles of Bhutan
Reptiles of Nepal
Reptiles of India